About Face is a 1942 American comedy film directed by Kurt Neumann and written by Eugene Conrad and Edward E. Seabrook. The film is the second of the Hal Roach's Streamliners Army film series with stars William Tracy and Joe Sawyer.  The film also features Jean Porter, Marjorie Lord, Margaret Dumont, Veda Ann Borg and Joe Cunningham. The film was released on April 16, 1942, by United Artists.

Cast  
 William Tracy as Sgt. Dorian 'Dodo' Doubleday
 Joe Sawyer as Sgt. William Ames
 Jean Porter as Sally
 Marjorie Lord as Betty Marlowe
 Margaret Dumont as Mrs. Culpepper
 Veda Ann Borg as Daisy, Blonde Hustler
 Joe Cunningham as Col. Gunning
 Harold Goodwin as Capt. Caldwell
 Frank Faylen as Bartender Jerry
 Dick Wessel as Bartender Charlie
 Charles Lane as Rental Car Manager

References

External links 
 

1942 films
American black-and-white films
1940s English-language films
Films directed by Kurt Neumann
United Artists films
1942 comedy films
American comedy films
Military humor in film
World War II films made in wartime
Films scored by Edward Ward (composer)